Mark Christopher Wingett (born 1 January 1961) is an English actor.

He is best known for his roles as PC/DC Jim Carver in The Bill and EastEnders as Mike Swann, Hollyoaks as Frank Symons and Heartbeat as Terry Molloy. His first screen role was in the 1967 film To Sir, with Love as a school pupil.

Acting career
Wingett was born in Melton Mowbray, Leicestershire. His father was an officer in the Royal Navy, and the family moved to wherever he was stationed, including Malta and Singapore, but mostly in Portsmouth. He attended Padnell Junior School in Cowplain, followed by Horndean Technology College (then known as Horndean Bilateral School).

Wingett wanted to act from his youth and joined the National Youth Theatre. His film debut came in 1979 when he played Dave, a reckless and rebellious mod, in Quadrophenia. Because the film was X-rated, he was too young to watch it legally.

In 1983 he made his first appearance as PC Jim Carver in "Woodentop", which became the pilot episode for The Bill. He was one of four actors in "Woodentop" who returned in the series' first complete season. He played Jim Carver in around 780 episodes, from 1984 until his departure in 2005 which ended 21 years on The Bill. Jim Carver was central to several major plotlines on The Bill, including the character's struggles with alcoholism, gambling and as a victim of domestic violence. Wingett made a brief return in March 2007 to coincide with the departure of Trudie Goodwin, then the only other remaining original cast member.

In 2005 he appeared in the BBC One soap opera EastEnders as Mike Swann, the father of Mickey Miller and Dawn Swann, initially for a week-long stint. He returned to the soap in late 2005, leaving in March 2006. Also in 2005 he appeared as Terry Molloy, a London gangster who had turned Queen's evidence on his cohorts following a robbery in the Heartbeat episode A Fresh Start.

Wingett provides the voiceover for the British television version of the hit American TV series American Chopper aired on the Discovery Channel. He also appeared in the "Spartacus" episode of the BBC's Heroes and Villains as the gladiator trainer Lentulus Batiatus.

In 2009, he appeared in the BBC daytime series Missing as Danny Hayworth alongside Pauline Quirke, returning to the programme for its second series in 2010.

In 2018, he issued a privately-printed pamphlet 'Tattered Troubadour', a 36 page disquisition on the musician GG Allin at his own publishing house Nantz Press. 

In addition to acting, Wingett has directed several stage productions. In 2010, he directed the play Good to Firm by Ed Waugh and Trevor Wood at the Customs House, South Shields. In 2000, Wingett directed the play Lone Star by James McLure, in a production which toured Australia and starred his fellow Bill cast members Russell Boulter and Huw Higginson.

Personal life
Wingett's partner is Sharon Martin, a makeup artist. They have a daughter, Jamila, and a stepson Benny from Martin's previous relationship. The couple separated in 2000 after Yvonne Williams, a fire-eater who had appeared on The Bill as an extra, went to the press detailing her affair with Wingett over a number of years, but had reconciled by 2003 after a two-year separation. They both worked on the 2012 film Snow White and the Huntsman, with Martin as head of the makeup department and Wingett playing the character of Thomas.

Wingett is a keen scuba diver, fisherman, skier and wreck hunter. He started diving in 1984 at a sub-aqua club for London black cab drivers.

Wingett's sister, Fiona Wingett, is a magazine editor. She was the editor of New Idea magazine in Australia in the mid-1990s, then returned to Britain to edit the Personal magazine for the Sunday Mirror. His brother, Matthew Wingett, wrote several episodes of The Bill in the 1990s. His first episode, "Thicker than Water" was submitted under the false name "Matthew Brothers", so that it would not receive favourable treatment because of their relationship.

TV and filmography
To Sir, with love (1967) - Potter
Quadrophenia (1979) – Dave
The Music Machine (1979) – Second heavy
Play for Today (1980) – Third youth
The Professionals (1980) – Big punk
Breaking Glass (1980) – Tony
Fox (1980) – Lee
Private Schulz (1981) – Walter
Take Three Women (1982) – Kenneth
Fords On Water (1983) -Eddie
The Bill (1983–2005, 2007) – PC/DC/DS Jim Carver
C.A.T.S. Eyes (1986) – Rider
Heartbeat (2005) – Terry Molloy
EastEnders (2005–2006) – Mike Swann
Franklyn (2008) – Frank Grant
Beyond the Rave (2008) – Ed's dad
Missing (2009–2010) – Danny Hayworth
Doctors (2010) – Martin Proudfoot
Break Clause (2010) – Giles Davis
Intruders (2011) – Dave
Banged Up Abroad (2011) – Chris
War of the Dead (2011) – David Selzman
Run For Your Wife (2012) – Man outside cafe
Snow White and the Huntsman (2012) – Thomas
Walking with the Enemy (2013) – Sorenzi
Hollyoaks (2013) – Frank Symons
Salting the Battlefield (2014) – Football supporter
The Lost Choices (2015) – Dave
Far from the Madding Crowd (2015) – Bailiff no. 1
I am Hooligan (2016) - RayKing of Crime (2018) - Marcus King
Vera (episode "The Seagull", 2019) – John Brace
Doll House (2020) – James

References

External links
  (Flash format)
 

1961 births
20th-century English male actors
21st-century English male actors
English male soap opera actors
Living people
Male actors from Leicestershire
National Youth Theatre members
People from Melton Mowbray